The Peru Records in swimming are the fastest times ever swum by an individual from Peru. These national records are maintained by Peru's national swimming federation: Federación Deportiva Peruana de Natación (FDPN).

FDPN keeps records for both for men and women, for both long course (50m) and short course (25m) events. Records are kept in the following events (by stroke):
 freestyle: 50, 100, 200, 400, 800 and 1500;
 backstroke: 50, 100 and 200;
 breaststroke: 50, 100 and 200;
 butterfly: 50, 100 and 200;
 individual medley: 100 (25m only), 200 and 400;
 relays: 200 free (25m only), 400 free, 800 free, 200 medley (25m only), and 400 medley.

All records swum in finals, unless noted otherwise.

Long Course (50m)

Men

|-bgcolor=#DDDDDD
|colspan=9|
|-

|-bgcolor=#DDDDDD
|colspan=9|
|-

|-bgcolor=#DDDDDD
|colspan=9|
|-

|-bgcolor=#DDDDDD
|colspan=9|
|-

|-bgcolor=#DDDDDD
|colspan=9|
|-

Women

|-bgcolor=#DDDDDD
|colspan=9|
|-

|-bgcolor=#DDDDDD
|colspan=9|
|-

|-bgcolor=#DDDDDD
|colspan=9|
|-

|-bgcolor=#DDDDDD
|colspan=9|
|-

|-bgcolor=#DDDDDD
|colspan=9|
|-

Mixed relay

Short Course (25 m)

Men

|-bgcolor=#DDDDDD
|colspan=9|
|-

|-bgcolor=#DDDDDD
|colspan=9|
|-

|-bgcolor=#DDDDDD
|colspan=9|
|-

|-bgcolor=#DDDDDD
|colspan=9|
|-

|-bgcolor=#DDDDDD
|colspan=9|
|-

Women

|-bgcolor=#DDDDDD
|colspan=9|
|-

|-bgcolor=#DDDDDD
|colspan=9|
|-

|-bgcolor=#DDDDDD
|colspan=9|
|-

|-bgcolor=#DDDDDD
|colspan=9|
|-

|-bgcolor=#DDDDDD
|colspan=9|
|-

Mixed relay

Notes

References
General
Peruvian Long Course Records 17 February 2023 updated
Peruvian Short Course Records 7 February 2023 updated
Specific

External links
FDPN web site
FDPN records page

Peru
Records
Swimming
Swimming